In Greek mythology, Teuthras (Ancient Greek: Τεύθρας, gen. Τεύθραντος) may refer to two different figures:

 Teuthras, an Athenian prince as son of King Pandion and possibly the naiad Zeuxippe, thus can be considered the brother of Erechtheus, Butes, Philomela and Procne. He was called the father King Thespius of Thespiae. He was said to be the founder of Teuthrone, a town in Laconia.

 Teuthras, the king of Teuthrania and the adopted father of Telephus.

Notes

References 

 Apollodorus, The Library with an English Translation by Sir James George Frazer, F.B.A., F.R.S. in 2 Volumes, Cambridge, MA, Harvard University Press; London, William Heinemann Ltd. 1921. ISBN 0-674-99135-4. Online version at the Perseus Digital Library. Greek text available from the same website.
 Hesiod, Works and Days from The Homeric Hymns and Homerica with an English Translation by Hugh G. Evelyn-White, Cambridge, MA.,Harvard University Press; London, William Heinemann Ltd. 1914. Online version at the Perseus Digital Library. Greek text available from the same website.
 Pausanias, Description of Greece with an English Translation by W.H.S. Jones, Litt.D., and H.A. Ormerod, M.A., in 4 Volumes. Cambridge, MA, Harvard University Press; London, William Heinemann Ltd. 1918. . Online version at the Perseus Digital Library
 Pausanias, Graeciae Descriptio. 3 vols. Leipzig, Teubner. 1903. Greek text available at the Perseus Digital Library.
 Stephanus of Byzantium, Stephani Byzantii Ethnicorum quae supersunt, edited by August Meineike (1790-1870), published 1849. A few entries from this important ancient handbook of place names have been translated by Brady Kiesling. Online version at the Topos Text Project.
 Thucydides, The Peloponnesian War. London, J. M. Dent; New York, E. P. Dutton. 1910. Online version at the Perseus Digital Library. Greek text available from the same website.

Princes in Greek mythology
Attican characters in Greek mythology